Kapciuhi is a village in the Vitebsk Region of northeastern Belarus.

Sources

Populated places in Vitebsk Region